Richard I. Furbush (January 4, 1904 – July 15, 1990) was an American politician who served as President of the Massachusetts Senate.

Early life
Furbush was born on January 4, 1904, in Waltham, Massachusetts. He dropped out of high school after his sophomore year to help support his widowed mother (he later earned his high school equivalency from Harvard University extension courses). He first worked at a factory making sweater sleeves. He then worked for the Waltham Watch Company. During the 1950s he was vice president of Adams Engineering Co.

Political career
Furbush began his political career in 1936 by campaigning for Republican gubernatorial candidate John W. Haigis. Furbush ran for delegate to the state Republican convention, but lost to George Drury by 31 votes. Drury urged Furbush to run for Waltham city council. He was elected and the following year ran for a seat in the Massachusetts House of Representatives. He served in the House from 1939 to 1943. He then represented the 5th Middlesex District in the Massachusetts Senate. In 1950 he was the majority floor leader. From 1951 to 1957 he was President of the Senate. In 1956, he ran for Secretary of the Commonwealth. He lost to incumbent Edward J. Cronin 53% to 46%. From 1957 to 1974, Furbush was executive secretary of the Metropolitan District Commission.

Furbush died on July 15, 1990, in Waltham, Massachusetts.

See also
 Massachusetts legislature: 1939, 1941–1942, 1943–1944, 1947–1948, 1949–1950, 1951–1952, 1953–1954, 1955–1956

References

1904 births
1990 deaths
20th-century American politicians
Republican Party members of the Massachusetts House of Representatives
People from Waltham, Massachusetts
Presidents of the Massachusetts Senate
Republican Party Massachusetts state senators